Jack Gibson may refer to:
 Jack Gibson (rugby league) (1929–2008), Australian player and coach
 Jack Stanley Gibson (1909–2005), Irish physician
 Jack Gibson (ice hockey, born 1880) (1880–1955), ice hockey player and executive
 Jack Gibson (ice hockey, born 1948), ice hockey player
 Jack Gibson, musician with American band Exodus
 Jack Gibson (schoolmaster) (1908–1994), English schoolmaster, scholar, academic and British Himalayan mountaineer
 Joseph Deighton Gibson Jr. (1920–2001), actor, disc jockey, MC, father of Black Appeal radio, Jack the Rapper Radio Convention

See also
 John Gibson (disambiguation)